Abd al-Malik of Samanid may refer to either of two kings of the Samanids:

Abd al-Malik I (Samanid emir)
Abd al-Malik II (Samanid emir)